John Bhattacharya also known as Shaurja Bhattacharya (born 24 June 1994) is an Indian model and actor, who works in Bengali film and television industry.

Career
Bhattacharya started his career with the Bengali television series Bojhena Se Bojhena. Apart from Bojhena Se Bojhena he has worked many television serial such as Thik Jeno Love Story, Nojor. In 2021 he made his film debut with the film Golondaaj.

Works

Television

Movies
 Golondaaj
 Tui Amar Hero

Music videos

References

External links 
 

Bengali male television actors
Indian male actors
Living people
1994 births